Phryganophilus is a genus of beetles belonging to the family Melandryidae.

The species of this genus are found in Europe and Northern America.

Species:
 Phryganophilus angustatus Pic, 1953
 Phryganophilus auritus Motschulsky, 1845

References

Melandryidae